Novosemenkino is a rural locality (a selo) in Chekmagushevsky District, Bashkortostan, Russia. The population was 207 as of 2010. There are 4 streets.

Geography 
Novosemenkino is located 32 km southwest of Chekmagush (the district's administrative centre) by road. Uybulatovo is the nearest rural locality.

References 

Rural localities in Chekmagushevsky District